Taissier Ahmad Khalaf (also written Taysir Khalaf), (born in Quneitra 1967), is a Syrian-Palestinian novelist, critic and researcher. He has written over 30 books including the 2017 International Prize for Arabic Fiction nominee novel The Slaughter of the Philosophers.

Career
Khalaf studied media and graduated from the University of Damascus in 1993. He started writing novels and joined the Arab Writers Union. He was also interested in historic research and produced several works focusing on Arab history, the Levant and especially Palestine. His historical research works include an edition of Mawāniḥ al-uns bi-riḥlatī li-Wādī al-Quds by 18th century traveler Al-Luqaimi which describes Jerusalem under Ottoman rule; a history of the Golan Heights based on the writings of Arab historians, and a research regarding the authenticity of Abu Khalil Qabbani's journey to the United States in the late 19th century.

In literature, Khalaf utilized historical events in many of his novels; The Slaughter of the Philosophers, which was nominated for the International Prize for Arabic Fiction, have the Roman conquest of Palmyra and the life of queen Zenobia in Rome as a background for the protagonist but the novel focuses more on the philosophical life of Palmyra rather than the political history. As of 2017, Khalf resides in Dubai.

Selected publications

Short story

Novels

Historic research

 Archival Resource Key (ARK): ark:/13960/t82k1wr2f

References

Citations

Sources

1967 births
Syrian scholars
Palestinian novelists
Palestinians in Syria
Living people
Damascus University alumni